Di Di Di is the second studio album from Chinese all-female band Hang on the Box.

Track listing

Personnel
Wang Yue – vocals
Yang Fan – guitar
Yilina – bass
Shen Jing – drums

References
Di Di Di album
Extracts on MySpace.com
Sister Benten Records Online
[ Allmusic listing]

2003 albums
Hang on the Box albums